Nathan Louis Bump (born July 24, 1976) is a former Major League Baseball relief pitcher who played for the Florida Marlins from 2003 to 2005.

A native of Towanda, Pennsylvania, Bump attended Penn State University, and in 1996 he played collegiate summer baseball with the Cotuit Kettleers of the Cape Cod Baseball League. He was selected by the San Francisco Giants in the 1998 Major League Baseball Draft as the 25th overall pick.

On July 26, 2004, Bump recorded his only MLB save. During a blowout victory against the Phillies, Bump pitched 3 shutout innings to close out an 11-3 Marlins victory.

In May , Bump signed a minor league contract with the Giants and was assigned to their Double-A affiliate, the Connecticut Defenders. He became a free agent after the season, and was signed by the Camden Riversharks on April 6, 2009.

On July 3, 2009, Bump signed with the Detroit Tigers and was assigned to their Triple-A affiliate, the Toledo Mudhens. Bump became a free agent at the end of the season. On December 24, 2009, Bump signed a minor league contract with the Philadelphia Phillies. On November 2, 2011, Bump elected free agency.

References

External links

1976 births
Living people
Florida Marlins players
Baseball players from Pennsylvania
Major League Baseball pitchers
Penn State Nittany Lions baseball players
Pennsylvania State University alumni
People from Towanda, Pennsylvania
San Jose Giants players
Salem-Keizer Volcanoes players
Portland Sea Dogs players
Shreveport Captains players
Albuquerque Isotopes players
Connecticut Defenders players
Toledo Mud Hens players
Camden Riversharks players
Lehigh Valley IronPigs players
Cotuit Kettleers players